The Blonde Odalisque or Resting Girl (Jeune fille couchée or L'Odalisque blonde) is the title of two oil-on-canvas paintings by François Boucher. The first dates to 1751 and is now in the Wallraf–Richartz Museum in Cologne, whilst the second was produced in 1752 and is now in the Alte Pinakothek in Munich. The model may be  Marie-Louise O'Murphy, mistress of Louis XV for two years. They belong to the odalisque genre.

Analysis
Boucher's The  Blonde  Odalisque, or Resting  Girl, is  filled  with  soft  pastel  colors  such  as  pinks,  yellows,  and  blues. The profusion of flowery tones boldly embodies the Rococo era. The  nude  girl  and  suggestive  symbols  throughout  the  painting  help  convey an eroticism that is characteristic of much  Rococo  painting.  The  different  shades  of  yellow  throughout  the  piece  create  a  serene  tone  that accentuates  the  girl's  pinkish  nude  body.  The viewer's eye is directed to the girl by the  drapes  that hang  down  the  side  of  the  room.  The  open  book  that  seems  to be  abandoned,  the  lone  rose  left  on  the  floor,  and  even  her  expression  can  be  interpreted  a  few  different  ways.  She  could  either  be  surprised  or anxious.  Maybe  someone  is  entering  the  room  that  she  wasn't expecting,  or  she  could  be waiting  anxiously  for  someone to  arrive.

Background
Intimacy and delicacy are common themes found in Boucher's work. Venus Consoling Love and The Triumph of Venus are two of Boucher's other works that convey these themes. Both pieces show how Boucher's work progressed and helped pave the way to creating The Blonde Odalisque'''. His painting style is soft and delicate, yet bold brush strokes are representative of common Rococo themes such as delicacy and beauty. 

Boucher painted two somewhat different versions of The Blonde Odalisque. The first was made in 1751 and is now in Cologne, Germany. The Cologne version shows the girl resting with a book by her side and a fallen rose in the bottom middle of the painting. The second version of the painting was made in 1752 and is located in Munich, Germany. This version has a small golden box with a lion on the top in place of where the book was in the original version, and it has a different flower on the floor in a different location. The flower is tucked under the bed and is off to the left. The pillows on the floor in the Munich version are much lighter. The Cologne version with the book has a shadow cast over the pillows and some of the book.

Boucher and Marie-Louise O'Murphy met through their affiliation with the Académie royale de peinture et de sculpture in Paris, which is also known as The Academy of Painting. Boucher was the principal painter at the academy when he met Marie and chose her to be his chief model. Boucher claimed to have relied on Marie's looks for inspiration for his future paintings. Marie quickly succeeded as a model at The Academy of Painting and was eventually recognized by King Louis XV and became his youngest mistress. 

Marie-Louise O'Murphy
The woman seen in the painting is Marie-Louise O'Murphy, an Irish woman who was also known as Louison. She was born in 1737 and at the age of 14 became the youngest mistress to King Louis XV; she was still only 14 years old when she modelled for this painting. After the painting was commissioned by the French court of the Ancien Régime, The King was so intrigued by the painting that he summoned her for himself. She stayed with The king for two years before she was seen as a threat to The King's other mistresses and was caught asking the King personal questions. She was later asked to leave the Parc-aux-Cerfs, which was what Louis XV's secret brothel was called. Madame de Pompadour, Louis XV's most famous mistress, would regularly dismiss young mistresses for trying to get closer to Louis XV, these accusations are often overlooked.

See also
 100 Great Paintings''

References 

Collection of the Alte Pinakothek
Collections of the Wallraf–Richartz Museum
1751 paintings
1752 paintings
Nude art
Paintings by François Boucher